The 1860 United States presidential election in Florida took place on November 2, 1860, as part of the 1860 United States presidential election. Voters chose three electors of the Electoral College, who voted for president and vice president.

Florida was won by Southern Democratic candidate John C. Breckinridge, who won the state by a margin of 26.13%.

Republican Party candidate Abraham Lincoln was not on the ballot in the state.

This was the last presidential election Florida would participate in until the 1868 election due to the American Civil War and the beginnings of the Reconstruction Era.

Results

See also 

 1860 United States House of Representatives election in Florida
 1860 Florida Gubernatorial election

References

Florida
1860
1860 Florida elections